Häggvik may refer to two places in Sweden:

 Häggvik, Kramfors Municipality, the location of Häggviks stave church
 Häggvik, Sollentuna, a district of Sollentuna Municipality
 Häggvik railway station, a Stockholm commuter rail station; see Sollentuna railway station